Minorca Halt (Manx: Stadd Minorca) is an intermediate stopping place on the northern section of the Manx Electric Railway on the Isle of Man.

Location
It is situated next to the viaduct of the same name and in typical style of the railway is served only by a corrugated iron hut painted in the familiar colour scheme of green and cream.  The hut that stands at this halt was originally erected in about 1900 at Halfway House and later removed to its present location.

Access
The halt is accessible via a series of steps to the old road below.

Route

Also
Manx Electric Railway Stations

References

Sources

 Manx Electric Railway Stopping Places (2002) Manx Electric Railway Society
 Island Images: Manx Electric Railway Pages (2003) Jon Wornham
 Official Tourist Department Page (2009) Isle Of Man Heritage Railways

Railway stations in the Isle of Man
Manx Electric Railway
Railway stations opened in 1899